Sustainability in New Zealand is being increasingly recognised as being good practice and the government has made some moves toward this goal.

History

Over the relatively short human occupation of New Zealand, huge changes had been made to the natural environment. Although efforts were made by a small number of individuals and organisations in highlighting environmental issues, only ad-hoc measures were made by the government at central and local level. Sustainability became a concept that emerged from the environmental movement which become a social and political movement of its own right in the 1960s. In 1972 the Values Party formed, being the first national-level Green party.

The New Zealand government has enacted legislation to enshrine sustainability principles in law, notably the Resource Management Act 1991. It was a landmark piece of legislation, being the first to adopt the principle of sustainability.

In 2003 the government announced the Sustainable Development Programme of Action. The Govt3 programme was also announced that year, but was cancelled in March 2009.

As in many other countries, there were demand for sustainable products and services and some companies began filling this demand. In March 2007 Westpac became the "first New Zealand bank to offer a 'green' home loan." There was also increasing calls for green growth, a path of economic growth that uses natural resources in a sustainable manner. The Ministry of Economic Development set up the Green Growth Advisory Group. The lobby group Pure Advantage formed in July 2011 to promote green growth and in 2012 released a report stating that New Zealand should improve its environmental performance and improve its image. Some of the environmental rankings, including Yale University's Environmental Performance Index, showed that New Zealand was not improving its overall sustainability. New Zealand is a green country although it is small it still continues to be an eco friendly country.

Strengths
The international business adviser, author and speaker Paul Gilding believes New Zealand dairy farmers have a significant advantage over other countries because they run pasture-fed systems, rather than grain-fed as in the US. Another advantage is New Zealand's reputation as a clean and green country, at least compared with most other countries. "As the demand rises for clean and green food, the better off New Zealand dairy is," Gilding said.

See also
Conservation in New Zealand
Energy Efficiency and Conservation Authority
Environment of New Zealand
Generation Zero (organisation)
Green building in New Zealand
New Zealand Centre for Sustainable Cities

References

Further reading
}

External links
sustainability.govt.nz

Organisations
Centre for Sustainability
Sustainable Business Council
Sustainability Council of New Zealand
Sustainable Living Education Trust
Sustainable Otautahi Christchurch
Transition Towns New Zealand Aotearoa
Pure Advantage
350.org Aotearoa